Dirty Rotten Filthy Stinking Rich is the debut studio album by American glam metal band Warrant, released in 1989.

The album was highly successful, spawning the hit singles "Heaven" (No. 2, 1989), "Down Boys" (No. 27, 1989) and "Sometimes She Cries" (No. 20, 1990). The album peaked at number 10 on the Billboard 200.

The unique cover art features "Fugazi", known as "Cashly Guido Bucksley" in the "Big Talk" music video, an overpaid, amoral infrastructure manager and archetypal business psychopath. Artwork by Pop Surrealism artist, Mark Ryden.

The first four words of the album's title ("Dirty Rotten Filthy Stinkin'...!") were mentioned in the intro to the title track of their 1990 follow-up album Cherry Pie.

Musical style
The album's sound is typical of the Sunset Strip glam metal scene of the 1980s, featuring heavy guitars and melodic, catchy choruses.

Production and marketing
The album was released amidst some controversy. It was widely rumored that guitarists Erik Turner and Joey Allen had not played a note on the album and that all guitar work had been performed by ex-Streets guitarist and session musician Mike Slamer. While the rumor has never been verified, Slamer's wife confirmed in 1998 that her husband played guitar on the record. Mike Slamer has stated in interviews that he played guitar and the lead solos on the album.
Producer Beau Hill stated in a 2012 interview that Slamer did in fact play on the album. Beau had said to the band that the "songs are really great, but I think we’re a little weak in the solo department and so I like to bring somebody in". Beau also stated that "everybody in the band signed off on it and everything was done above ground".

During the recording of the album, vocalist Jani Lane walked in on his best friend in bed with his girlfriend, leading to his nervous breakdown, and its release was delayed by several months while Lane recovered. These events would later be recounted in the single "I Saw Red" on the band's following album, Cherry Pie.

The record was produced and engineered by Beau Hill, who also contributed keyboards and backing vocals. It was recorded at The Enterprise in Burbank, California.

Songs
The album's themes, which include materialism ("32 Pennies", "D.R.F.S.R"), sex ("Down Boys", "So Damn Pretty", "Cold Sweat"), heartbreak ("Heaven") and loneliness ("Sometimes She Cries"), would be echoed on later Warrant releases.

The debut single from the band was "Down Boys", the song has been described as "one of the toughest, heaviest songs in [Warrant's] catalog, and certainly at the top of both categories in terms of their hit singles".

The second single was the smash hit "Heaven" which took Warrant's record company by surprise. Indeed, once the widespread appeal of the song became apparent, the band was instructed to re-record the track to lend it a "bigger radio sound". Beau Hill remixed the song for the single release. The first 250,000 copies of the record featured the original version while later pressings featured a new version.
"Heaven" had previously been recorded by Jani Lane and Steven Sweet's old band Plain Jane.

"Big Talk" was released as the third single followed by the popular "Sometimes She Cries" as the fourth single. All the singles featured music videos.

Reception

AllMusic gave Dirty Rotten Filthy Stinking Rich a rating of four out of five stars, saying that the album was "sleek and clean, built on processed guitars and cavernous drums" and that it "sounds exactly like that year [1989], both for better and worse." Dave Reynolds of Kerrang! considers the album "hardly outstanding", with only "a bunch of distinctly average songs matched to a brace of worthwhile moments".

Solo recording dispute
Much of the record's solos have been unofficially credited to Mike Slamer. Beau Hill felt Joey Allen and Erik Turner were not at the standard required to compete with similar bands at the time for the solos. It was Hill who put Slamer forward, in an interview with Full in Bloom   Hill claimed Slamer played all solos in all songs.

However, in September 2020, Erik Turner was interviewed on the  Chuck Shute podcast and stated everyone [Turner, Allen and Slamer] played on the tracks and Mike [Slamer] did some of the solos. 
In June 2022, Allen was interviewed on the subject and stated each solo on each song and who played what. Some songs were entirely Slamer, while others were a mix of the three and some entirely Allen.

Allen states Hill wasn't particularly helpful with Turner and Allen, stating Hill required them to record "bone dry" [no effects] while allowing Slamer effects such as delay.  Allen confirms he did take lessons from Slamer even after the completion of the record.

Track listing

Personnel
Warrant
Jani Lane – lead vocals, acoustic guitar
Joey Allen – rhythm and lead guitar
Erik Turner – rhythm guitar
Jerry Dixon – bass
Steven Sweet – drums

Additional personnel
Mike Slamer - guitar solos on some tracks
Beau Hill - keyboards, backing vocals
Bekka Bramlett - backing vocals

Production
Beau Hill - producer, engineer, mixing (5, 7, 10)
Joel Stoner - engineer
John Jansen - mixing (except 5, 7, 10)

Charts

Album

Singles

Certifications

Video Album

Warrant: Live - Dirty Rotten Filthy Stinking Rich is the first Warrant video album released in 1990 on VHS and Laserdisc, featuring the band performing live in concert on the D.R.F.S.R tour in 1989. The video features the album cover character  (calling himself "Cashly Guido Bucksley") watching Warrant in concert.
The video was certified Platinum.

Track listing
"So Damn Pretty"
"Ridin' High"
"32 Pennies"
"Heaven" (music video)
"Down Boys"
"Cold Sweat"
"D.R.F.S.R."
"Sometimes She Cries"
"Big Talk" (music video)

Certifications

References

External links
 Warrant: What could have been ?

Warrant (American band) albums
1989 debut albums
1990 video albums
Columbia Records albums
Columbia Records video albums
Albums produced by Beau Hill
Albums with cover art by Mark Ryden